Haymana is a town and district of Ankara Province in the Central Anatolia region of Turkey, 72 km south of the capital, Ankara. According to the 2010 census, the population of the district is 33,886, of whom 9,091 live in the town of Haymana.

Etymology
According to the 1074-dated dictionary Dīwān ul-Lughat al-Turk, haymana means prairie in Turkish.

History
Archaeological excavations were launched in Gavur Kalesi, a castle situated in the village of Dereköy, in the years 1930 and 1998. The results showed that it was an important Phrygian settlement. Besides, the tumuli located in Türkhöyük and Oyaca villages prove that the area was also inhabited during the Hittite period.

After the periods of the Roman and Byzantine rule, the area was captured by the Seljuk Turks in 1127. After the Battle of Köse Dağ it came under Ilkhanate control for a while. In the mid 14th century the area was annexed by the Ottomans. After a brief period of Timurid rule in the wake of the Battle of Ankara in 1402, it was re-captured by the Ottomans.

Demographics

Age structure 
The district of Haymana has a relatively young population but it is ageing very quickly.

Administrative structure

Towns
 Balçıkhisar
 Bumsuz
 Çalış
 Sindiren
 Yurtbeyli

Villages

Prominent residents
 Ömer Özkan, Turkish plastic surgeon. An associate professor at the Akdeniz University in Antalya, he led the team that performed in 2012 the first full face transplant in Turkey.
 Burhan Sönmez, writer
 Haymana Prison has had notable residents as inmates over the years, including historian Fikret Başkaya, professor of foreign relations Haluk Gerger, Workers' Party (Turkey) leader Doğu Perinçek, political scientist Yalçın Küçük, and playwright Bilgesu Erenus (the latter two jointly published their Haymana memoirs).

Notes

References

External links
 District governor's official website 
 District municipality's official website 

 
Towns in Turkey
Populated places in Ankara Province
Kurdish people of Central Anatolia
Spa towns in Turkey
Districts of Ankara Province
Kurdish settlements in Ankara Province